Jade Starling is an American singer-songwriter, and the lead vocalist for 1980s band Pretty Poison. She lives in New Jersey. Starling is a gay-rights activist and a supporter of same-sex marriage. She also speaks phonetic Spanish and often records songs in both Spanish and English.

Philanthropy
Starling has worked as a gay-rights activist, performing on behalf of many gay-rights benefits including gay-rights parades and LGBT benefits. In 1997, her song "Let Freedom Ring" was used to help further the concept of legalizing gay marriage. She has also been active in the "Ball Community" through her work with Jay Blahnik.

Musical career

Pretty Poison
Starling has appeared on various Billboard Charts 9 times since 1984. Topping the Dance/Club chart 3 times with 2 of those club hits crossing over to both the Pop and R&B Chart.

1984 – "Nightime" – No. 13 Dance Svengali Records
1987 – "Catch Me (I'm Falling)" – No. 1 Dance, No. 8 Pop, No. 13 R&B – Svengali/Virgin
1988 – "Nightime" – No. 1 Dance, No. 36 Pop, No. 64 R&B
1997 – "Let Freedom Ring" – No. 17 Dance
1998 – "Catch Me 98" – No. 43 Dance
1998 – "My Heart Will Go On" – No. 37 Dance
1998 – "Honey Brown" – #41 Dance
2013 – "Insomniak" – No. 31 Dance
2014 – "Think About U" – No. 14 Dance
2015 – "Better & Better" – No. 3 Dance

She has released 4 LPS since 1988.
1988 – Catch Me (I'm Falling)
1995 – Sex in Violets - Deflowered
1997 – Pretty Poison's Greatest Hits Vol. 1
1998 – Euphoria – very rare as it was recalled shortly after its release.
2014 – Captive – Jade Starling solo LP

Starling has received numerous awards along with Pretty Poison founder and long time co-writer Whey Cooler.

References

1960 births
American women singer-songwriters
Living people
Place of birth missing (living people)
American LGBT rights activists
American singer-songwriters
21st-century American women